Verberie is a commune in the Oise department in northern France.

The railway station is on the line from Compiègne to Crépy-en-Valois. The inhabitants are known as Sautriauts.

History
On 1 October 856 Judith, the daughter of Charles the Bald, King of West Francia, married Æthelwulf, King of Wessex at the royal palace of Verberie.

During the First World War it was the scene of fighting on the 1 September 1914, and in 1918. The village has several war cemeteries including the Verberie French National Cemetery which contains the graves of 3,221 French soldiers (of whom 2,339 are unidentified), 52 servicemen from the United Kingdom, and one Canadian cavalryman.

Personalities
It was the birthplace of author and feminist Juliette Adam.

Gallery

See also
 Communes of the Oise department
 Château d'Aramont

References

Communes of Oise
Oise communes articles needing translation from French Wikipedia